Igreja e Convento de Nossa Senhora de Jesus do Sítio (The Convent of Our Lady of Jesus), also known as Church of the hospital, is a church in Santarém, Portugal, just outside the city walls. It has been classified as a national monument since 1923.

History

The convent was founded by D. Miguel Castro, Archbishop of Lisbon, in the late seventeenth century to house the friars of the Third Order of Saint Francis. The convent was built in the area then known as 'Out of Town', where the palace of the Archbishops and the Chapel of St. Mary Magdalene formerly stood. Later, in the nineteenth century, the 'Hospital João Afonso' was built next to the convent, where it remained until the 1980s.

Architecture
The convent church is one of the best extant examples of the Portuguese Mannerism style. Adjoining the church, lies the Chapel of the Third Order of St. Francis, also known as the 'Golden Chapel', which is considered a masterpiece of national baroque style, completely gilded.

References
 Material added from translation of Portuguese Wikipedia entry found here

External links
 Church and Convent of Our Lady of Jesus Site in the IGESPAR database (Portuguese)

Churches in Santarém District
National monuments in Santarém District